Stanislawa "Stasia" Dabrowski (1926 - August 2020) was an Australian humanitarian. In 1996, the government of the Australian Capital Territory named her Citizen of the Year. She was awarded a medal of the Order of Australia in 1998.

References

External links
 http://catalogue.nla.gov.au/Record/3124114
 http://www.chiefminister.act.gov.au/media.php?v=7262&m=52

1926 births
2020 deaths
Members of the Order of Australia
Australian people of Polish descent
Australian humanitarians
Women humanitarians